The Motorola Droid 4 (XT894) is a smartphone made by Motorola Mobility. It was released with Android 2.3 and can be upgraded to Android 4.1. It was released on Verizon Wireless's network on February 10, 2012. It is the successor to Motorola's Droid 3, and is one of the first smartphones to support GLONASS in addition to GPS.

As initially marketed by Verizon, when first launched, the Droid 4 was not capable of roaming in countries with non-CDMA wireless networks. However, after installing the update from Android 2.3 to Android 4.0, global roaming is automatically enabled on the handsets, allowing the Droid 4 to use GSM bands and provide HSPA data connections outside the US. However, LTE speeds are only available on Verizon's CDMA network. Unlike previous versions of the phone, the Droid 4 does not have a hot-swappable battery.

Processor
The Droid 4 has a dual core TI OMAP processor with 1.2 GHz, updated from the Droid 3's dual core 1 GHz processor.

Webtop
Similarly to the Motorola Atrix 4G, it has the integrated Ubuntu-based 'Webtop' application from Motorola.  The Webtop application is launched when the phone is connected to an external display through a Laptop dock or HD multimedia dock. While in Webtop mode, the phone, operating with a similar UI to one which might be found on a typical Linux desktop, can run several applications on external display such as Firefox web browser, SNS clients and 'mobile view' application enabling total access of Droid 4 and its screen. In September 2011, Motorola released the source code of Webtop application at SourceForge.

With the release of Android 4.0 Ice Cream Sandwich for the Droid 4, the Webtop application has been replaced. Instead of the Ubuntu-based interface and applications, the Droid 4 switches to ICS's tablet mode. This allows seamless access to all of the phone's applications without moving back and forth between two user interfaces.

Updates 
The Droid 4 originally came with Android 2.3 "Gingerbread" out of the box, however, Motorola gradually updated the handset to Android 4.0 "Ice Cream Sandwich" and then finally to Android 4.1 "Jelly Bean". Motorola has also released regular maintenance updates from time to time.

Unofficial 
LineageOS support exists and is currently being maintained by the community, with LineageOS 14.1 (Android 7.1.2 "Nougat") being the latest official port for the device. Currently there is an ongoing effort to port mainline Linux to the phone, with most of the devices already supported except for voice calls and the cameras. Work is being done to make the Droid 4 supported by Maemo Leste.

References

External links

Mobile phones introduced in 2012
Discontinued smartphones
Android (operating system) devices
Motorola Droid 4
Droid 4
Verizon Wireless
Slider phones